A by-election was held in the Dáil Éireann Dublin West constituency in Ireland on Friday, 23 May 2014, following the resignation of Independent Teachta Dála (TD) Patrick Nulty on 22 March 2014. It was held on the same day as the 2014 European and local elections, and the Longford–Westmeath by-election.

The Electoral (Amendment) Act 2011 stipulates that a by-election in Ireland must be held within six months of a vacancy occurring.

Socialist Party candidate Ruth Coppinger was elected on the sixth count.

Result

See also
List of Dáil by-elections
Dáil constituencies

References

2014 in Irish politics
2014 elections in the Republic of Ireland
31st Dáil
By-elections in the Republic of Ireland
Elections in Fingal
By-elections in County Dublin
May 2014 events in Ireland